Henry L. Eaton (October 17, 1834 in Columbia, New York – January 4, 1890) was a member of the Wisconsin State Assembly and the Wisconsin State Senate.

Legislative career
Eaton was elected to the Assembly in 1864 and 1865. He later represented the 28th District in the Senate from 1872 to 1873. Eaton was a Republican.

References

People from Herkimer County, New York
People from Richland County, Wisconsin
Republican Party Wisconsin state senators
Republican Party members of the Wisconsin State Assembly
1834 births
1890 deaths
19th-century American politicians